The General Electric Switchgear Plant is a historic factory building located at 421 North 7th Street at Willow Street in the Callowhill neighborhood of Philadelphia, Pennsylvania.  It was built in 1916, and is a seven-story, seven bay by nine bay, reinforced concrete building with brick facing. It was designed by William Steele & Company for General Electric, which manufactured electric switchboard equipment there.

The building was added to the National Register of Historic Places in 1985. A music venue, Franklin Music Hall, occupies part of the building.

See also

National Register of Historic Places listings in North Philadelphia

References

External links

Industrial buildings and structures on the National Register of Historic Places in Philadelphia
Industrial buildings completed in 1916
1916 establishments in Pennsylvania
General Electric